Lego DC Super Hero Girls: Brain Drain is a 2017 American computer-animated superhero comedy film based on the DC Super Hero Girls franchise, produced by Warner Bros. Animation. It is the third film in the DC Super Hero Girls franchise, as well as the first in the series to be based on the DC Super Hero Girls brand of Lego. It was digitally released on July 25, 2017 and was followed by a DVD release on August 8, 2017. The movie premiered on Cartoon Network in the US on November 19, 2017.

Plot
The entire planet is in peril as Wonder Woman, Supergirl and Batgirl have to battle an unknown villain as well as short-term amnesia. The trio thought they all had the same bizarre dream where they witnessed Katana and Bumblebee stealing diamonds. They gave chase, but then they all woke up. Turns out the events didn't only happen in their heads, and the three girls slowly started to understand they lost some time—a whole day. Others remember their missing 24 hours. The girls all acted extremely out of character, doing things like uploading an embarrassing video of Harley Quinn without her permission and replacing the school's Amethyst with Principal Waller's car. Their activities get them expelled. That makes them realize not everything is as it seems and leads them on a chase towards the hidden mastermind behind the plot, Eclipso.

Cast

Yvette Nicole Brown as Amanda Waller
Greg Cipes as Beast Boy
Romi Dames as Lena Luthor
John DiMaggio as Gorilla Grodd / Wildcat
Teala Dunn as Bumblebee
Anais Fairweather as Supergirl
Grey Griffin as Wonder Woman / Lois Lane
Jennifer Hale as Mad Harriet
Josh Keaton as Flash
Tom Kenny as James Gordon
Rachael MacFarlane as Artemiz
Mona Marshall as Eclipso
Meredith Salenger as Lashina
Ashlyn Selich as Batgirl
Stephanie Sheh as Katana
Tara Strong as Harley Quinn

Reception
Renee Longstreet for Common Sense Media gave the film a two out of five star rating and commented, "Still, while Lego DC Super Hero Girls: Brain Drain has music, jokes, suspense, and ongoing likable characters, it's a ho-hum production, lacking originality and specialness. And even little kids might be annoyed by some of the shrill and overly cutesy voice performances; grownups will simply cringe. Then there's the matter of Lego joining the DC family once again. Other than enhancing their toy and merchandise catalogues, what possible reason could there be to turn the animated teen Super Hero Girls into Legos?"

See also
DC Super Hero Girls
Lego DC Super Hero Girls
Lego DC Super Hero Girls: Super-Villain High

References

External links

2017 direct-to-video films
2017 animated films
DC Super Hero Girls films
2017 computer-animated films
Films about sentient toys
Direct-to-video animated films based on DC Comics
2010s superhero comedy films
2010s American animated films
2010s direct-to-video animated superhero films
Brain Drain
Warner Bros. Animation animated films
Warner Bros. direct-to-video animated films
American children's animated comedy films
American children's animated superhero films
Lego DC Comics Super Heroes films
2010s English-language films